Ping Che is a village in Ta Kwu Ling, North District, Hong Kong.

Che (Jyutping: ce4; literally "clear land for agriculture by burning") refers to the method of farming used by the Che people.

Administration
Ping Che is a recognized village under the New Territories Small House Policy. For electoral purposes, Ping Che is part of the Sha Ta constituency of the North District Council. It is currently represented by Ko Wai-kei, who was elected in the local elections.

Features
The Cheung Shan Monastery in Ping Che is a declared monument. Probably first constructed in 1789, the existing two-hall structure is believed to have been fully rebuilt in 1868.

The Tin Hau Temple in Ping Che is a Grade II Historic Building.

See also
 Ping Yuen River
 Tan Shan River

References

Further reading
 P.H. Hase, "Cheung Shan Kwu Tsz (長山古寺), An Old Buddhist Nunnery in the New Territories and its Place in Local Society" Journal of the Royal Asiatic Society Hong Kong Branch. Vol. 29 (1989). ISSN 1991-7295.

External links

 Delineation of area of existing village Ping Che (Ta Kwu Ling) for election of resident representative (2019 to 2022)

Villages in North District, Hong Kong